Laura Peternellie Van Pappelendam (1883–1974) was an American painter and teacher. She was Professor Emeritus at the School of the Art Institute of Chicago.

Biography 
Laura Peternellie Van Pappelendam was born in Keokuk, Iowa on February 10, 1883. Van Pappelendam was the daughter of Alice (née McCullough) and John Bernard Van Pappelendam. She moved to Chicago to study at the School of the Art Institute of Chicago (formally Art Institute of Chicago), from 1904 to 1911.

During the summers of 1920 to 1927 and 1950 to 1955, she painted in Santa Fe, New Mexico. In the late 1930s she spent summers in Mexico, studying under Diego Rivera.

She taught at the Art Institute of Chicago from 1909 to 1959; and well as the University of Chicago from 1918 to 1948. She exhibited at the Art Institute Annuals, with the Chicago Society of Artists and at the Arts Club and Renaissance Society.

Van Pappelendam died in Norwalk, California on her birthday, February 10, 1974.

References

Further reading 
 University of Chicago Library Special Collections Research Center -Laura Van Pappelendam Papers

1883 births
1974 deaths
American women painters
20th-century American women artists
School of the Art Institute of Chicago alumni
University of Chicago faculty
20th-century American painters
Painters from Iowa
American women academics